Angel of the Lord is a 2005 Czech fantasy comedy film directed by Jiří Strach. Based on folk tales by Božena Němcová, it tells the story of a ne'er-do-well angel who descends to Earth to prove himself and in the process, saves his own soul.

In 2016, Strach directed a sequel, Angel of the Lord 2.

Plot
Up in Heaven, the bumbling angel Petronel feels misunderstood and unfairly treated. He complains to God and asks for an opportunity to prove himself. God grants him this request by asking him to replace Saint Peter at the pearly gates while the latter is away.

At the gates, Petronel meets the devil Uriáš, who is there to collect sinners once they have been judged. Petronel sentences three souls to Hell, then begins to play cards with the devil, neglecting his duties. A lineup develops, and God shows up to investigate. He rebukes Petronel, who takes it upon himself to castigate the Lord instead of taking responsibility for his negligence. God then decides to punish the impudent angel by sending him down to Earth in the form of a mendicant monk. He is tasked with saving the soul of one sinner within the span of a day. If he fails, he will be condemned to Hell. Uriáš is sent down to accompany Petronel.

Meanwhile, another story is taking place on Earth. Count Maxmilián spends his time in revelry, while his administrators and servants rob him behind his back. Petronel arrives at the castle as a beggar and mistakenly fulfills the wishes of the miscreants taking advantage of Maxmilián, instantly turning him into a beggar and enriching the knaves. The Virgin Mary, who witnesses these events from Heaven, reproaches Petronel. The angel promises to make up for his errors and proceeds to fix the consequences of his misguided actions.

As the angel's time on Earth expires, he is surprised not to find himself in Hell but back in Heaven. He queries God about this, wondering why he was forgiven, since he failed in his original task, to save a sinner. The Lord reveals to Petronel that he managed to save himself by righting his wrongs. The story ends with a Christmas celebration.

Cast and characters
 Ivan Trojan as angel Petronel
 Jiří Dvořák as devil Uriáš
 Zuzana Kajnarová as maid Dorotka
 David Švehlík as count Maxmilián
 Oldřich Navrátil as estate administrator Metoděj
 Zuzana Stivínová Jr. as keyholder Francka
 Jiří Bartoška as God
 Klára Issová as the Virgin Mary
 Jiří Pecha as Saint Nicholas
 Veronika Žilková as Saint Veronica
 Anna Geislerová as Saint Anne
 Gabriela Osvaldová as Archangel Gabriel
 Josef Somr as the reeve
 Jana Štěpánková as Chef Róza
 Jana Hlaváčová as the soul of widow Vomáčková
 Jiřina Jirásková as the soul of abbess Magdalena
 Stanislav Zindulka as the soul of beadle Lorenc
 Oldřich Vlach as the servant Josef
 Boni Pueri as angels

See also
 List of films about angels

References

External links
 

2005 films
2005 comedy films
Films based on fairy tales
Films about angels
2000s Christmas films
Czech fantasy films
Czech children's films
Czech comedy films
2000s Czech-language films